The 2007–08 is the 40th season for the Northern Premier League Premier Division, and the first season for the Northern Premier League Division One North and South.

Created as part of non-league restructuring, the Division One leagues temporarily have 18 teams each, with a targeted number of 22 teams. To help increase the league to 20 teams for next season there will only be one relegation this year per league. Many clubs expressed their concern that a 34-game season would be too short. To remedy this, clubs will play an extra 8 games (4 home, 4 away) against teams within geographically related groups.

Premier Division

The Premier Division featured four new clubs:
Buxton, promoted as champions from NPL Division One
Eastwood Town, promoted via play-offs from NPL Division One
Stamford, transferred from the Southern League Premier Division
Worksop Town, relegated from the Conference North

League table

Results

Play-offs

Stadia and Locations

Division One North 

This was the first season of the Northern Premier League Division One North. It Featured six new teams:

Mossley relegated from the Premier Division
Radcliffe Borough relegated from the Premier Division
Garforth Town promoted as fourth in the Northern Counties East League Premier Division
Newcastle Blue Star promoted from the Northern League Division One
F.C. United of Manchester promoted as champions of the North West Counties League Division One
Curzon Ashton promoted as runners-up of the North West Counties League Division One
Lancaster City as reformed club

Fixture increase 
The following are the groups which decided the extra 8 games for all teams:

League table

Results

Play-offs

Division One South 

This was the first season of the Northern Premier League Division One South. It featured seven new teams:
Nantwich Town promoted as third in the North West Counties League Division One
Retford United promoted as champions of the Northern Counties East League Premier Division
Sheffield promoted as runners-up in the Northern Counties East League Premier Division
Carlton Town promoted as third in the Northern Counties East League Premier Division
Quorn promoted as third in the Midland Football Alliance
Spalding United transferred from the Southern League Division One Midlands
Grantham Town relegated from the Premier Division

Fixture increase 
The following are the groups which decided the extra 8 games for all teams:

League table

Results

Play-offs

Cup results
Challenge Cup: Teams from all 3 divisions.

Eastwood Town 3–0 Skelmersdale United

President's Cup: Teams from lower 2 divisions.

FC United of Manchester 2–0 Radcliffe Borough

Chairman's Cup: Between Champions of NPL Division One North and NPL Division One South.

Retford United 2–0 Bradford Park Avenue

Peter Swales Shield: Between Champions of NPL Premier Division and Winners of the Chairman's Cup.

Fleetwood Town 2–1 Bradford Park Avenue1

1 Retford United qualified but its ground standards were not high enough for it to play in the shield.

References 

Northern Premier League seasons
7